Majid Jordan is a Canadian R&B duo, consisting of singer Majid Al Maskati and producer Jordan Ullman from Toronto, Ontario. They formed in 2011 and signed to OVO Sound, the record label co-founded by rapper Drake, producer Noah "40" Shebib and Oliver El-Khatib, releasing their debut EP, A Place Like This, in 2014.

Beginnings
Majid Jordan was formed in 2011 by Majid Hani Al Maskati (born October 22, 1990), originally from Bahrain, and Jordan Kenneth Cooke Ullman (born September 8, 1993), originally from Toronto, Ontario, after they met each other at Majid's birthday party at a bar in Toronto. Both were students at the University of Toronto, and later that week they began working on music together in Jordan's dorm, releasing their first official single, "Hold Tight", in just one day, which they posted anonymously on SoundCloud. Working between Ullman's dorm room and his parents' basement, they launched their first joint EP titled Afterhours on SoundCloud under the pseudonym Good People. Noah "40" Shebib, producer for the Toronto rapper Drake, was impressed by their Afterhours EP, and he signed them to his OVO Sound record label.

Career

2013–2016: A Place Like This and Majid Jordan
In 2013, Majid Jordan co-produced and were credited to be featured on Drake's track "Hold On, We're Going Home", which was included from his platinum-selling album Nothing Was the Same. "Hold On, We're Going Home" went on to become Drake's most successful single-charting in several countries, including United States, Canada, United Kingdom, Australia, and New Zealand.

On July 7, 2014, Majid Jordan released their first official single as a duo through SoundCloud. On July 17, 2014, ten days later, they released their official debut EP, A Place Like This, which was digitally through OVO Sound, the record label co-founded by rapper Drake. They went on to release music videos for three of the songs from the EP, including the title track "A Place Like This", "Her" and "Forever".

On July 10, 2015, Drake premiered their first single, titled "My Love" for their upcoming debut studio album on Apple's Beats 1 radio, during an interview with radio host Zane Lowe; their label boss is also featured on the track. After its premiere it was released straight to Apple Music and the iTunes Store.

In February 2016, the duo released its self-titled debut by OVO sound, featuring a song with Drake, called "My Love". On February 17, 2016, the duo also revealed their first-ever North American tour starting with a show in San Francisco, with other appearances were scheduled for Miami, Brooklyn, Atlanta, Toronto, Chicago, and Los Angeles.

2017–2019: The Space Between 
On April 21, 2017, Majid Jordan released "Phases" as the lead single from their second studio album. Its music video was released on May 25, 2017.

Majid Jordan released "One I Want" as the second single from their sophomore album on June 15, 2017. The song features a guest appearance from OVO labelmate PartyNextDoor. A music video was released on July 7, 2017.

On July 31, 2017, Majid Jordan announced that their sophomore album, The Space Between, would be released in the fall.

On September 29, 2017, Majid Jordan released "My Imagination" featuring OVO labelmate Dvsn as the third single from The Space Between. It was released along with the album pre-order. The album was released on October 27, 2017.

On September 7, 2018, Zhu released his second studio album, Ringos Desert, which features a guest appearance from Majid Jordan on the song "Coming Home." That same day, Majid Jordan released two songs titled "Spirit" and "All Over You".

On July 24, 2019, Majid Jordan released "Caught Up," a song that features Khalid. The music video premiered on the Majid Jordan YouTube page the same day.

On July 25, 2019, DJ Snake released his album, Carte Blanche, which features a guest appearance from Majid Jordan on the song "Recognize." A remix of the song which features the French DJ Mercer, was released on September 27, 2019.

Majid Jordan released a song titled "Superstar" on October 4, 2019.

2020–present: Wildest Dreams 
On April 5, 2021, after a year-long hiatus and break from social media, Majid Jordan released their lead single "Waves of Blue" from their third studio album.

On June 18, 2021, Majid Jordan released "Been Through That" as the second single from their third studio album. The single premiered on the Sirius XM OVO Sound 42 Radio channel.

Majid Jordan released "Summer Rain" as the third single from their third studio album on September 17, 2021.

On October 3, 2021, Majid Jordan announced that their third studio album, Wildest Dreams, would be released on October 22, 2021. The album marks the tenth anniversary of the duo forming, and the release date is on Majid Al Maskati's birthday.

Majid Jordan released their fourth single, "Forget About the Party", from their third studio album. It premiered on October 18, 2021, on the Apple Music 1 Zane Lowe Show.

Discography

Studio albums

Extended plays

Singles

As lead artist

As featured artist

Other charted songs

Guest appearances

Music videos

As lead artist

As featured artist

Production discography

Singles produced

2013
Drake – Nothing Was the Same
08. "Hold On, We're Going Home" (featuring Majid Jordan) (produced with Nineteen85, add. production by 40)

Beyoncé – Beyoncé
09. "Mine" (featuring Drake) (produced by 40, add. production by Majid Jordan & Omen)

2014
Majid Jordan – A Place Like This
01. "Forever"
02. "All I Do"
03. "Her"
04. "U"
05. "A Place Like This"

2016
Majid Jordan – Majid Jordan
01. "Learn From Each Other" (produced with Illangelo)
02. "Make It Work"
03. "My Love" (featuring Drake) (produced by Nineteen85 & Illangelo, co-produced by Majid Jordan & 40)
04. "Small Talk"
05. "Pacifico"
06. "Shake Shake Shake"
07. "Love Is Always There"
08. "Warm"
09. "Something About You" (produced with Illangelo)
10. "Day and Night"
11. "King City" (produced with Nineteen85)
12. "Every Step Every Way"

Drake – Views
 04. "Feel No Ways" (add. production by 40 & Kanye West)
 14. "Childs Play" (produced by 40, add. production by Majid Jordan, Metro Boomin & Nineteen85)

DJ Khaled – Major Key
 02. "For Free" (featuring Drake) (produced with Nineteen85)

2017 
Majid Jordan – The Space Between

 01. "Intro"
 02. "Gave Your Love Away"
 03. "OG Heartthrob"
 04. "Body Talk" (produced with Stargate)
 05. "Not Ashamed"
 06. "One I Want" (featuring PartyNextDoor)
 07. "You"
 08. "Phases"
 09. "Asleep"
 10. "What You Do To Me"
 11. "My Imagination" (featuring Dvsn) (produced with Nineteen85)
 12. "The Space Between"
 13. "Outro"

2021 
Majid Jordan – Wildest Dreams

 01. "Dancing on a Dream" (featuring Swae Lee) (produced with KOZ)
 02. "Summer Rain" (produced with KOZ)
 03. "Stars Align" (featuring Drake) (produced by OZ & Dez Wright)
 04. "Waves of Blue" (produced with KOZ)
 05. "Wildest Dreams" (produced with KOZ)
 06. "Forget About the Party" (produced with KOZ)
 07. "Been Through That"
 08. "Life Worth Living" (produced with KOZ)
 09. "Love Unconditional"
 10. "Sway" (featuring Diddy)
 11. "Sweet" (produced with Nineteen85)

Remixes

2016: Majid Jordan - "My Love" (featuring Drake) 
 
2022: Lila Drew - "2023 (Majid Jordan Remix)"

2022: Lila Drew - "2023 (Majid Jordan VIP Remix)"

Tours
 Majid Jordan Tour (2016)
 Majid Jordan II Tour (2016)
 Space Between Tour (2018)
 Wildest Dreams Tour (2021)

Awards and nominations

Notes

References

External links
 
 

Musical groups established in 2011
Canadian musical duos
Canadian record producers
Contemporary R&B duos
Musical groups from Toronto
OVO Sound artists
Warner Records artists
2011 establishments in Ontario